One of the rarest instruments ever made by Fender was called the Marauder. The Marauder was intended to join the product line shortly before Leo Fender sold the company to CBS, but it never went into production. After introducing the Jazzmaster in 1958 and the Jaguar in 1962, between 1964 and 1965, Fender prototyped the Marauder. There were two "versions" made: Type I, with four pickups hidden underneath the pickguard and which are shown in the 1965 catalog, and Type II, with the pickups mounted in a more conventional fashion on the pickguard and never appeared in any catalog.

Prototypes 
The original Fender Marauder prototype was a Jaguar guitar with an "L" serial number plate built in 1963, and personally owned, modified and played by Quilla "Porky" Freeman. In the late-70's, ‘Porky’ sold to dealer Norm Harris and soon sold it to guitarist/historian Robb Lawrence (who has documented the Marauder story). It utilized four large, slightly offset 12-pole experimental pickups with deep armatures producing a very percussive tonality. Porky also developed a novel hidden vibrato arm channeled within this Jaguar guitar. 
Eventually it went into the permanent collection of a well-known Bay area musician, where it remains to this day. (May, 17th, 2012)

The few 1964-65 Fender versions never officially passed the prototype stages, allegedly because the hidden pickups (Type I variation) were either too expensive for mass-production or the technology itself was too expensive to license.

These original Marauder samples had four wider, high powered pickups with 16 polepieces, all submerged deep into the body and hidden under the pickguard. The whole idea of Porky's was to have total ease of playability without any large pickups protruding and still have very versatile electronics. Naming the hidden pickup idea was logically akin to a masked marauder, hence the official catalog name. The four 3-way switches gave 48 different tonal characteristics with its in and out of phase pickup positions. 

They were never made available to the public and the six known pre-production models were given away as promotions to shops around the Fullerton, California area. 

The Type II variation has three exposed pickups, with the bridge pickup slanted as upon a Stratocaster. It also has seven switches and four knobs. The thinking behind the model was to combine the ideas behind the Stratocaster and Jaguar guitars while adding some new features to increase versatility.

Type I Features 
Porky's other personal instrument is a vibrato guitar, ice blue metallic (now aged to a Teal green metallic) with a matching headstock. It has five switches – four pickup controls (one per pickup – on/off/phased) plus a "lead/rhythm" Jaguar style upper-bout switch. It has two sets of volume/tone pots – rollers on top control plate (rhythm position) and traditional pots on the lower control plate (lead position).

Porky's ice blue metallic Marauder has a 1964 ‘L’ neck plate and was fitted with plastic button "F" Grover tuning machines, which were not used on the Marauders in the 1965 catalog, and was delivered in a brown tolex case. All hidden 16 pole pickups were custom made for these Marauder I models. The present owner of this faded blue Marauder sample also has one spare pickup luckily found on eBay.

At least five more of the original Marauder I models are known to have been produced. Fender and Bob Perine showcased two of these first Marauders, a sunburst vibrato version and a non-vibrato "hard-tail" green one, in their 1965–66 catalog as their most expensive guitars. Don Randall listed the instruments on more than one price sheet beginning in early 1965 before abandoning the project for unspecified reasons.

Besides the three seen in Bob Perine's promo picture (including the rocker switch, slant fret), it is not known if any of the other sighted Marauders (another sunburst one now white and candy apple red) current whereabouts are. One possible reason they ditched the Marauder might have been a disagreement of some sort between the new CBS owners of Fender and Quilla "Porky") H. Freeman, the inventor of the Marauder and owner of the patent. Patent #3,035,472, dated May 22, 1962, covers the Marauder's under the pickguard pickups: "the construction is such that the electromagnetic pickups may be housed within the body of the stringed musical instrument..." After Fender bailed out, Porky took his patented hidden pickup design to Rickenbacker, and in 1968, Rickenbacker made one prototype of a four-hidden-pickups-beneath-the-pickguard guitar before apparently deciding against going into production, again for unspecified reasons.

Variations 
Both the Fender and Rickenbacker four-hidden-pickups-beneath-the-pickguard Marauder prototypes survive to this day, but nobody has published any pictures of other original hidden-pickup Marauders and made their existence known to the guitar collecting world.
Both of these prototype guitars were initially owned by Porky Freeman and their provenance from him to the current owners has been well-documented by reliable persons who are alive today. The private owners desire anonymity and are known to only a few very dedicated guitar collectors.

Later guitars with the three visible pickups and/or slant frets were built on a differently shaped body, and were never officially named by Fender as Marauders or anything else. Still, some people refer to these experimental guitars as "Type II Marauders" for reasons that have never been clear.

In the 1999–2001, the Fender Custom Shop (Fred Stuart) built some guitars that bore some, but not all, of the Marauder characteristics and sold them as Fender Marauder Custom Shop reissues. The reason they weren't entirely accurate representations is that nobody, according to Mr. Stuart, knew the exact specifications of those 1965 catalog Marauders, even amongst Fender old-timers and collectors. Mr. Stuart stated that all he had to work with was the catalog photo and one body template, found in the Fender shop and labeled "Marauder" in pencil. These Custom Shop "Marauders" were wired differently, had different pickups, had different body shapes and slightly different dimensions and geometry from the original Marauders shown in the 1965 Fender catalog.

Around the turn of the 21st century, the Fender Custom Shop made a 12-string Marauder model. However, this guitar was radically different from the mid-1960s original, having fewer switches and a very different body shape.

New Models

Fender Modern Player Marauder (2011-2013) 

In October 2011, Fender introduced a new Marauder model as part of the Modern Player entry-level series. This Marauder shares the general body shape of the 1960s original but has a simplified switching system featuring a 5-way switch, master volume and tone controls. It also sports a Triplebucker humbucking pickup and a Modern Player Jazzmaster pickup in the lead and rhythm positions. This model is also unique as the first Fender production model to be made with a Koto wood body. The guitar has a C-shaped maple neck, rosewood fretboard, vintage-style synchronized tremolo bridge, vintage-style tuners, and nickel/chrome hardware. It was available in black and Lake Placid Blue versions.

A review of the humbucker mode cite a bright and punchy sound, which is said to work on heavy riffs and power chords while the triple-coil setting creates warmer tone at a slightly decreased output.

As of 2014, the Fender Modern Player Marauder model has now been discontinued with multiple vendors presently listing this version as an increasingly collectable model.collectors.

References

Marauder